Pinneo is an extinct town in Washington County, in the U.S. state of Colorado. The GNIS classifies it as a populated place.

A post office called Pinneo was established in 1883, and remained in operation until 1931. The community was named after B. F. Pinneo, a local law enforcement agent.

References

Ghost towns in Colorado
Geography of Washington County, Colorado